Blake Cashman (born May 10, 1996) is an American football linebacker for the Houston Texans of the National Football League (NFL). He played college football at Minnesota, and was selected by the New York Jets in the fifth round of the 2019 NFL Draft.

Professional career

New York Jets
Cashman was drafted by the New York Jets in the fifth round (157th overall) of the 2019 NFL Draft. He was placed on injured reserve on November 1, 2019.

On September 15, 2020, Cashman was placed on injured reserve after suffering a groin injury in Week 1. He was activated on October 17. On December 3, 2020, he was placed back on injured reserve after suffering a hamstring injury.

On September 14, 2021, Cashman was placed on injured reserve. He was activated on October 9, 2021. He was placed back on injured reserve after suffering a groin injury in Week 7.

Houston Texans
On March 18, 2022, Cashman was traded to the Houston Texans for a 2023 sixth-round pick. On December 2, 2022, he signed a one-year contract extension.

References

External links
Minnesota Golden Gophers bio

1996 births
Living people
People from Eden Prairie, Minnesota
Players of American football from Minnesota
Sportspeople from the Minneapolis–Saint Paul metropolitan area
American football linebackers
Minnesota Golden Gophers football players
New York Jets players
Houston Texans players